Poqui poqui, also spelled puke puke or puki puki, is a Filipino eggplant and scrambled eggs dish originating from the Ilocos Region of Northern Luzon in the Philippines. It is very similar to tortang talong in that the eggplant is first grilled directly on an open flame, then peeled and mashed. It is then added to ginisa (sauteed shallots, garlic, and tomatoes) and scrambled eggs. It is garnished with spring onions. It has a creamy texture and is usually eaten as a side dish to grilled fish and meat dishes, but it can also be eaten with white rice. It is believed that the name of poqui poqui may have originated from the Hawaiian dish poke due to the influx of Ilocano sugarcane workers to Hawaii during the American colonization of the Philippines, although they are very different dishes.

See also

Kulawo
Tortang talong
Tortang kalabasa
Ukoy
Carne norte guisado

References

External links

Eggplant dishes
Philippine cuisine
Ilocano cuisine